Bournedale station was a railroad station serving Bournedale, Massachusetts. Opened in 1848, it was relocated in 1911 during construction of the Cape Cod Canal and closed in the 1920s.

History
North Sandwich station was built by the Cape Cod Branch Railroad when the line was extended from Wareham to Sandwich in 1848. It was located off what is now Herring Run Road on the south side of the Herring River, approximately where the north canal service road / bike path is now located. Originally a flag stop, its ridership grew as Bournedale became a resort community. A new combination depot was built in 1895, by which time the stop was called Bournedale.

A ferry service was operated to connect the village to the station; a road bridge was never built despite requests from residents.

Bournedale station was closed sometime between 1919 and 1930. The station building is no longer extant. The ferry service continued to run until August 15, 1932.

References

External links

Bourne, Massachusetts
Old Colony Railroad Stations on Cape Cod
Stations along Old Colony Railroad lines
Former railway stations in Massachusetts